Lake Taminah is located in Grand Teton National Park, in the U. S. state of Wyoming. Lake Taminah is along a route often taken by climbers attempting to gain access to various mountain peaks, though the trails are not maintained. Near the outlet from Lake Taminah lies Shoshoko Falls, which later flows into Taggart Creek.

References

Lakes of Grand Teton National Park